Pharma fraud is a term to describe several illegal activities involving the manufacturing, marketing, and distribution of pharmaceuticals.

History 
Because of a lack of regulation and enforcement, the quality, safety and efficacy of both imported and locally manufactured medicines in many developing countries cannot be guaranteed. Subsequently, smuggling and illegal importation of drugs are common. Substandard and counterfeit drugs are then not only sold in these countries but also exported or re-exported. According to the World Customs Organization, counterfeit drugs are a $200 billion a year industry that kills hundreds of thousands of people annually.

The phrase "pharma fraud" was proposed by Ellen 't Hoen of MSF, during the 61st World Health Assembly meeting in Geneva. She proposed the phrase in response to controversies over the use of the term "counterfeiting" in draft WHA resolutions, to describe activities that often involved health risks from unsafe, substandard or fake medicines.  The use of the term counterfeit was problematic and inaccurate to describe all of these activities, and health experts were seeking a new term to collectively describe these harmful activities.

Definition 

Pharma fraud refers to:
 Trade involving counterfeit drugs: the practice of falsely claiming to be an authorized product of another firm, including but not limited to the use of another firm's mark to deceive the public.
 Deliberately manufacturing and marketing products that do not contain the required active ingredients or not contain the right amount of active ingredient.
 Packaging and labeling of drugs that make false claims regarding medical properties, including but not limited to the active medical ingredients, the date of expiration of products, or the methods of storage.
 Marketing of products using false claims regarding the efficacy of the product which will lead to the irrational use of medicines or deliberately failing to provide information about safety concerns of the product.
 Deliberate suppression of data, including evidence from clinical trials, that reveal adverse effects of the medicine.

Examples

In response to a meningitis epidemic in Niger from February to May 1995 (41,000 cases reported), the Niger authorities organized an extensive vaccination campaign. In March 1995, Niger received a donation of 88,000 Pasteur Mérieux and SmithKline Beecham vaccines from neighboring Nigeria. A Médecins Sans Frontières (MSF) team working with local health authorities noticed that the vaccines from Nigeria had an unusual appearance and inquiries were made. Pasteur Mérieux laboratories confirmed that the batch numbers and the expiration dates did not correspond to their manufacturing records. The drugs supplied by these companies had been substituted with counterfeit drugs. Tests carried out found no traces of active product, which confirmed that they were false. Bottles and labels were, however, copied to perfection. According to estimates, around 60,000 persons were inoculated with false vaccines out of a total 5 million vaccinated during the campaign.

References 

Fraud
Pharmaceutical industry
Food and Drug Administration